The 2017–18 Országos Bajnokság I was the 35th season of the Országos Bajnokság I, Hungary's premier Water polo league.

Team information

The following 10 clubs compete in the OB I during the 2017–18 season:

Regular season

Schedule and results
In the table below the home teams are listed on the left and the away teams along the top.

Championship playoff

Quarterfinals

Game 1

BVSC-Zugló Diapolo won the series 9–0 with points ratio, and advanced to the Semifinals.

Ferencvárosi TC won the series 9–0 with points ratio, and advanced to the Semifinals.

Semifinals
Higher ranked team hosted Game 1 plus Game 3 if necessary. The lower ranked hosted Game 2.

Game 1

See also
2017 Magyar Kupa (National Cup of Hungary)

References

External links
 Hungarian Water Polo Federaration 
 vizipolo.hu

Seasons in Hungarian water polo competitions
Hungary
Orszagos Bajnoksag I Women
Orszagos Bajnoksag I Women